Martin Linnes (born 20 September 1991) is a Norwegian professional footballer who plays as a right-back for Norwegian club Molde. A versatile player, he also played as a left-back, central midfielder, right midfielder and right winger.

Club career

Early years
Linnes started his career at Sander, then joined Kongsvinger. In 2010, he made his debut in the Norwegian top division.

Molde
Linnes joined Molde in 2012, after his contract with Kongsvinger had expired. On 9 April 2012, he made his first assist against Brann, which Molde won 2–1, and on 4 August 2012, scored his first goal against Sogndal, in a match which Molde won 2–1. On 17 September 2015, Linnes scored the third goal against Fenerbahçe in the 2015–16 UEFA Europa League group stage, 3–1 away win.

After four years for Molde, Linnes agreed with Galatasaray. In his Molde years, he played 152 games, scoring 14 goals and making 26 assists.

Galatasaray
In January 2016, Linnes signed a -year contract with Turkish club Galatasaray for a €2 million transfer fee. He picked number 27 for his shirt from its previous owner, Emmanuel Eboué. He made his debut for Cim-Bom against Akhisar Belediyespor in the 2015–16 Turkish Cup, which ended in a 1–1 draw.

On 26 January 2016, Linnes started as central midfielder with José Rodríguez against Kastamonuspor in 2015–16 Turkish Cup, and made an assist to Sinan Gümüş, who scored the third goal. In the second half, he returned to his main position at right-back, after Tarık Çamdal had been taken from the pitch. Galatasaray won that match 4–1 at home.

On 6 February 2016, he played his first Süper Lig match, a 0–0 draw at home against Konyaspor, playing the full 90 minutes right-back.

On 11 April 2019, Galatasaray extended his contract for two more seasons, until the end of 2020–21 season.

Return to Molde 
On 17 August 2021, Molde announced that they signed their former right-back Martin Linnes.

Career statistics

Club

International

Scores and results list Norway's goal tally first, score column indicates score after each Linnes goal.

Honours
Molde
 Tippeligaen/Eliteserien: 2012, 2014, 2022
 Norwegian Cup: 2013, 2014, 2021–22

Galatasaray
 Süper Lig: 2017–18, 2018–19
 Türkiye Kupası: 2015–16, 2018–19
 Süper Kupa: 2016,  2019

Norway U21
UEFA European Under-21 Championship bronze: 2013
Eliteserien Defender of the Year: 2014

References

External links
 
 
 
 
 
 

1993 births
Living people
People from Sør-Odal
Norwegian footballers
Association football fullbacks
Association football midfielders
Norway international footballers
Norway under-21 international footballers
Eliteserien players
Norwegian First Division players
Süper Lig players
Kongsvinger IL Toppfotball players
Molde FK players
Galatasaray S.K. footballers
Norwegian expatriate footballers
Norwegian expatriate sportspeople in Turkey
Expatriate footballers in Turkey
Sportspeople from Innlandet